Gasanov is an Azerbaijani surname. Notable people with the surname include:

Amir Gasanov (born 1987), Russian footballer
Dzhamaladin Gasanov (born 1964), Russian politician
Eldar Gasanov (born 1982), Ukrainian chess player
Elmar Gasanov (born 1983), Ukrainian classical pianist
Gasan Gasanov (born 1987), Russian footballer
Shamil Gasanov (born 1993), Russian footballer
Surnames of Turkmenistan origin

Turkmen-language surnames